Presidential elections were held in Slovenia on 22 October 2017. Nine candidates ran in the first round of the elections, in which the incumbent independent President Borut Pahor placed first and Marjan Šarec of the List of Marjan Šarec (LMŠ) placed second. No candidate received a majority of the vote in the first round, resulting in a run-off between Pahor and that was held on 12 November 2017. Pahor won the run-off with 53% of the vote; voter turnout in the second round was 42.13%, the lowest in any presidential election since independence.

Electoral system
The President of Slovenia is elected using the two-round system; if no candidate receives a majority of the vote in the first round, the top two candidates contest a runoff.

Under Slovenia's election law, candidates for president are required to meet one of three criteria:
The support of ten members of the National Assembly
The support of one or more political parties and either three members of the National Assembly or signatures from 3,000 voters
Signatures from 5,000 voters

Each political party can support only one candidate.

Candidates

Borut Pahor
The incumbent president Borut Pahor announced his intention to run for a second term in December 2016. A member of Social Democrats, he later stated he intends to run as an independent candidate. Pahor was seen from June as a clear frontrunner to win the election.

Marjan Šarec
Marjan Šarec, the mayor of Kamnik, announced his candidacy in May. He had previously served two terms as mayor after a career as an actor and comedian. During his acting career, he imitated several famous people, including the second president of Slovenia, Janez Drnovšek. Nevertheless, Šarec stated his candidacy would be completely serious, as he took a break from his stage personas when he was elected mayor. Criticizing Pahor for treating the presidential function as a celebrity, Šarec was viewed as a potentially strong candidate. Backed by his party Lista Marjana Šarca - Naprej Kamnik, Šarec successfully collected the required 3,000 votes of support.

Ljudmila Novak
In early August, Ljudmila Novak of New Slovenia announced her candidacy, as the first candidate supported by a major political party, Novak officially submitted the candidacy on 8 September. Novak served as the mayor of Moravče, got elected to the European Parliament in 2004 and led the party at the 2011 general election when the party returned to the National Assembly.

Maja Makovec Brenčič
In September, the Modern Centre Party announced that their candidate would be Maja Makovec Brenčič, the minister of education, science, and sport. Before entering the politics, Makovec Brenčič was a professor at the Faculty of Economics, University of Ljubljana.

Romana Tomc
The Slovenian Democratic Party announced the member of European Parliament Romana Tomc as their candidate. Tomc was also elected to the National Assembly in the 2011 election and was the vice-president of the Assembly.

Boris Popovič
Boris Popovič, mayor of Koper, was backed by his party Slovenia Forever. Prior to the presidential election, Popovič served three terms as a mayor. He was involved in several legal cases.

Angelca Likovič
Angelca Likovič was backed by the party Voice for Children and Families. Prior to retirement, Likovič was a teacher and the headmistress of an elementary school O.Š. Majda Vrhovnik in Ljubljana. Likovič is also known as a prominent opponent of the same-sex marriage law in the 2015 referendum and as a commentator in various reality shows.

Andrej Šiško
Andrej Šiško was backed by the party United Slovenia. A former member of Slovenian Territorial Defence, Šiško was also the leader of the ultras group Viole, supporters of NK Maribor. He was convicted to a year and ten months in prison.

Suzana Lara Krause
Suzana Lara Krause was backed by Slovenian People's Party. Krause graduated as a teacher of Slovenian and Russian languages, is self-employed and was not widely known in Slovenian politics prior to the election.

Failed or withdrawn
Milan Jazbec, Slovenia's ambassador to Macedonia, announced already in April that he would run as an independent candidate. Jazbec stated that his decision was based on a promise to the late Slovenian statesman France Bučar that he would become actively involved with national politics. Due to lack of support, Jazbec dropped out of the race in September.

Zmago Jelinčič Plemeniti, a former member of the National Assembly and the president of the far right Slovenian National Party, announced he would run for office for the third time. Jelinčič previously ran in the 2002 election, where he finished 3rd with 8.49% of the vote, and in the 2007 election, where he finished fourth—but with a significantly higher vote share, at 19.16%.

Some people announced their candidacies with support of non-parliamentary political parties, including sociologist Luj Šprohar (backed by Liberal Democracy of Slovenia).

Other people that announced their intention to run for office, including Milan Robič, Jožef Jarh, Ludvik Poljanec, Aleš Cepič, a comedian Žiga Papež, singers Damjan Murko and Dominik Kozarič, poet, dramatist, and actor Andrej Rozman-Roza, and sociologist Valerija Korošec.

Opinion polls

Hypothetical polling (– 28 September 2017)

First round (28 September 2017 – 22 October 2017)

Second round (23 October 2017 – 12 November 2017)

Results

First round 
The first round of the election was marked by the lowest voter turnout in a presidential election since 1992, at 44.2%. Despite most opinion polls predicting Pahor's victory in the first round (also, the exit polls predicted Pahor winning over 56% of the vote) Pahor only won 47.2%, resulting in the run-off against the second-placed Šarec. In his first reaction, Pahor called his result "encouraging given the general distrust in politics". Šarec stated he was happy with the result and with the fact that he made it to the run-off, he expressed hope that it will be possible to discuss topics that were not addressed in the first round campaign.

In the reactions to the results, media noticed that Pahor's failure to secure the victory in the first round was likely linked to the low turnout, the campaign was seen as "boring", foreign media also commented on Šarec's background as an actor. Commentators noticed that Tomc got almost twice as many votes as Novak, which some viewed as a victory of SDS over NSi. However, the candidates of the right-wing parties failed to more than a fifth of the vote, drawing comparison with Barbara Brezigar (SDS) who made it to the run-off in the 2002 election. SDS viewed the result of Tomc as a success, given the late start of the campaign and the fact that she won more vote than the opinion polls predicted, while Janez Janša stated that there are no major differences between Pahor and Šarec anyway. The bad result of the SMC candidate, Makovec Brenčič, was seen as a major blow to the largest party in the government and a warning before the 2018 general election. Šiško's result was seen as a surprise, as he ran as an anti-establishment candidate and even placed fourth in Maribor electoral unit. The result of Likovič that finished last was seen as an indication that there is little actual support for ZaO party outside the referendum campaigns.

Second round 
Pahor won the second round with 53% of the vote. Voter turnout was even lower than in the first round, at 42.1%. Pahor won in six electoral units while Šarec won in Kranj and Ljubljana Bežigrad.
Šarec quickly conceded and congratulated Pahor.

In his first reaction, Pahor acknowledged that many votes he received in the 2012 election as votes against the incumbent president Danilo Türk while this time people who voted for him did so in support of his activities. He pledged to be more vocal in the next term but will continue to avoid divisions between the left- and right-side parties. Pahor's head of campaign saw the high percent that Šarec won as a result of the election turning out to be a "referendum against Pahor".

Šarec expressed his satisfaction with the result, stating that it represented the desire of the people for a change. He further argued that the government should take note of the support demonstrated for a grassroots candidate representing the younger generation. After being asked whether he planned to continue to carry on the political momentum into the upcoming general election in 2018, he refused to make commitments, although he said that several people had already asked him to run.

Miro Cerar, the Prime Minister, whose SMC endorsed none of the candidates, and Milan Brglez, the Speaker of the National Assembly, both congratulated Pahor, as did the presidents of Austria Alexander Van der Bellen and Croatia Kolinda Grabar-Kitarović. Janez Janša of SDS also send congratulations but warned of the low voter turnout, which was "below the legitimate level".

References

Slovenia
2017 in Slovenia
October 2017 events in Europe
November 2017 events in Europe
Presidential elections in Slovenia